Timothy O. Howe (1816–1883) was a U.S. Senator from Wisconsin from 1861 to 1879. Senator Howe may also refer to:

Carleton G. Howe (1898–1993), Vermont State Senate
George Howe (attorney) (1824–1888), Vermont State Senate
Jeff Howe (born 1959), Minnesota State Senate
John Howe (Minnesota politician) (born 1963), Minnesota State Senate
Richard C. Howe (born 1924), Utah State Senate